Ali Youssef (born 5 August 2000) is a professional footballer who plays as a winger for BK Häcken. Born in Sweden, he represents the Tunisia national team.

Club career
Youssef grew up in Biskopsgården, Hisingen, a borough of Gothenburg Municipality. He started playing football for Färjenäs IF and later IF Warta before joining the BK Häcken youth academy in 2012. Ahead of the 2019 season, he was promoted to the first team. In June 2019, he extended his contract with Häcken until 2023.

Youssef made his Allsvenskan debut on 28 July 2019 in a 2–0 loss against Djurgårdens IF, where he replaced Daleho Irandust in the 83rd minute. In July 2021, in a UEFA Europa Conference League match against Aberdeen, Youssef suffered a cruciate ligament injury, which kept him sidelined for a year. 

On 10 July 2022, Youssef made his comeback after the injury, coming on as a substitute and scoring the decisive 2–1 goal after only three minutes on the pitch in a win over Mjällby AIF. Later that month, in a match against IF Elfsborg, he injured his cruciate ligament again, sidelining him for another extended period. Youssef made a total of four appearances, one of which was as a starter, and scored one goal during the 2022 season, where Häcken won their first ever league title.

International career
Born in Sweden, Youssef is of Tunisian descent. He represented the Sweden U20 in a friendly 3–2 win over the Norway U20s in October 2019, scoring 2 goals.
In May 2021, Youssef was called up to the Tunisia national team for the first time, tentatively committing his international future to the nation of his parents' birth. He debuted with Tunisia in a friendly 1–0 friendly win over DR Congo on 5 June 2021.

Honours 
BK Häcken
 Allsvenskan: 2022

References

External links
SvenkFotboll Profile

2000 births
Living people
Tunisian footballers
Tunisia international footballers
Swedish footballers
Sweden youth international footballers
Swedish people of Tunisian descent
Association football wingers
BK Häcken players
Allsvenskan players
Footballers from Gothenburg